Morris Hirshfield (1872–1946) was a Polish-American painter. He "is considered one of the most critically acclaimed self-taught artists of the 20th century" according to the J. Paul Getty Museum.

Life

Hirshfield was born in Poland, but emigrated to the United States at the age of eighteen. He found employment at a women's coat factory; later, he founded a business with his brother, first manufacturing women's coats, then women's slippers. He retired in 1935 due to failing health.

Hirshfield began to paint in 1937. He was soon championed by gallerist Sidney Janis, who had a great interest in self-taught artists. Janis included some of Hirshfield's works in a 1939 exhibition, Contemporary Unknown American Painters, and a 1942 book, They Taught Themselves: American Primitive Painters of the 20th Century. His painting found favor in surrealist circles; he was lauded by André Breton, and was a participant in the first American surrealist exhibition, First Papers of Surrealism, in 1942.

He received a one-man show at the Museum of Modern Art in 1943. The show occasioned some negative criticism; Art Digest referred to Hirshfield as "The Master of Two Left Feet", and the bad press the show received figured into the demotion of MoMA's director, Alfred H. Barr Jr.

Hirshfield died in New York City in 1946.

Work

Only 77 works were created by Hirschfield during his career. His heavily patterned work, featuring women or animals, is often reminiscent of textiles, perhaps as a legacy of his first career.

Exhibitions
 Morris Hirshfield Rediscovered, American Folk Museum, New York, 2022–23

References

1872 births
1946 deaths
20th-century American painters
Outsider artists
Polish emigrants to the United States
American male painters
20th-century American male artists
Painters from New York City